Dissopsalis ("double scissors") is a genus of teratodontine hyaenodonts of the tribe Dissopsalini. The older species, D. pyroclasticus, lived in Kenya during the middle Miocene, while the type species, D. carnifex, lived in  Pakistan and India during the middle to late Miocene.

Dissopsalis is the last known hyaenodont genus. It lived alongside its relative Hyaenodon weilini, a member of the very successful genus Hyaenodon, during the Miocene in China. Dissopsalis survived to the end of the Miocene, whereas H. weilini did not.

Phylogeny
The phylogenetic relationships of genus Dissopsalis are shown in the following cladogram:

See also
 Mammal classification
 Dissopsalini

References

Hyaenodonts
Miocene mammals of Africa
Miocene mammals of Asia
Prehistoric placental genera